Polali Jayarama Bhat (born 14 November 1951) was the managing director (MD) and chief executive officer (CEO) of Karnataka Bank, a major Indian commercial bank in the private sector.

Early life
Bhat born in Mangalore, Dakshina Kannada. He is an alumnus of Polali Vidya Vilas School, Board High School Gurupur and St. Aloysius College, Mangalore. He completed his MSc from Mysore University in 1972 with a first rank. After successfully appearing for the CAIIB examination in the year 1986, he served as a lecturer at Government Junior College, Mulki for a brief period of three months in 1972.

Career
His career in banking began after he joined Karnataka Bank Limited in 1973 as a probationary officer. In 1976 he became a Branch Manager and served various branches for 14 years. He was promoted as chief accountant at the Bank's head office in the year 1993. Bhat was later appointed as Assistant General Manager and Deputy General Manager and was elevated to the post of Chief General Manager in 2005. He was appointed as Managing Director & CEO of the Bank on 14 July 2009. On completion of his 2nd term he has been re-appointed for a third consecutive term of three years w.e.f. 14.07.2015.

He has rich experience in all the facets of banking operations. He was on the Board of Universal Sompo General Insurance Company Ltd., a joint venture of the Bank, from 2007 to 2009.

Jayarama Bhat was a member on Management Committee of the Indian Banks Association (IBA) from August 2010 to August 2014, during which period he was also the chairman of 'IBA Committee on Member Private Sector Banks'. Presently, he is a member of IBA Standing Committee on Retail Banking. During his tenure as managing director, the bank has secured many awards in the field of IT, CSR, MSME, etc.

Recognition
Bhat is the honorary president of Bankers' Club in Mangaluru. He has been conferred with several awards including the Aryabhata International Award and the Outstanding Manager Award by Mangalore Management Association and the A. Shama Rao Memorial Outstanding Achievement Award. He was awarded T. A. Pai Memorial Shrestha Banker award by Delhi Kannadiga. He has also been awarded CEO with HR Orientation by Asia Pacific HRM Congress. He was bestowed with the New Year Award-2015 jointly by Manipal University, Academy of General Education and Syndicate Bank.

See also

Karnataka Bank

References

External links
 Official Website of Karnataka Bank Ltd

Indian bankers
Living people
Indian chief executives
1951 births
Businesspeople from Mangalore